Wyoming Highway 254 (WYO 254) is a  state road northwest of Casper, Wyoming known as Salt Creek Highway.

Route description
Wyoming Highway 254 begins its south end the Town of Mills, just outside Casper at US 20 Business/US 26 Business (Yellowstone Highway). The Highway continues north into the Town of Bar Nunn at 0.79 miles (located northwest of Casper). WYO 254 continues north until  where it turns east onto Wardwell Road for a short distance and there meets I-25/US 87 (exit 191) where WYO 254 ends.

History
Wyoming Highway 254 is the former alignment of US 87 prior to relocation along I-25.

Major intersections

References

External links 

Wyoming State Routes 200-299
WYO 254 - US 20 BUS/US 26 BUS to US 20/US 26
WYO 254 - US 20/US 26 to I-25/US 87

Transportation in Natrona County, Wyoming
254
U.S. Route 87